Moolchand is a Delhi Metro station in Delhi. It is located between Lajpat Nagar and Kailash Colony stations on the Violet Line. The station was opened with the first section of the Line on 3 October 2010 in time for the Commonwealth Games opening ceremony on the same day. The station, being nearby to several schools like Kendriya Vidyalaya and Frank Anthony, is frequently used by school children who come from far away places.

Station layout

Facilities
Available ATMs at Moolchand metro station are HDFC, Ratnakar Bank, PNB and SBI

Nearby
Moolchand Medcity Hospital, Defence Colony, Andrews Ganj, Acharya  Munir Ashram, Rajkumari Amrit Kaur College of Nursing, Haldiram, The Japan Foundation, Guru Nanak Market,

Connections
Buses and rickshaws connect the station to nearby destinations.

See also
List of Delhi Metro stations
Transport in Delhi
Delhi Metro Rail Corporation
Delhi Suburban Railway

References

External links

 Delhi Metro Rail Corporation Ltd. (Official site) 
 Delhi Metro Annual Reports
 
 UrbanRail.Net – descriptions of all metro systems in the world, each with a schematic map showing all stations.

Delhi Metro stations
Railway stations opened in 2010
Railway stations in South Delhi district